Dannah is a feminine given name. Notable people with the name include:

Dannah Gresh (born 1967), American author and speaker
Dannah Phirman (born 1975), American actress, comedian, and writer

Feminine given names